Cold Squad is a Canadian police procedural television series that premiered on CTV on January 23, 1998, at 10 p.m., and ran for seven seasons. Led by Sergeant Ali McCormick (Julie Stewart), a team of homicide detectives from the Vancouver Police Department reopen long-unsolved, or "cold" cases (the titular "Cold Squad"), using present-day forensic technology and psychological profiling to help crack them. Cold Squad premiered simultaneously in French Canada on Séries+ as Brigade spéciale.

The series was created by Matt MacLeod, Philip Keatley and Julia Keatley, and produced by Keatley MacLeod Productions and Alliance Atlantis in association with CTV Television Network, with the participation of the Canadian Television Fund (Canada Media Fund).

Cold Squad is the first prime time national series produced out of Vancouver. With seven seasons and 98 episodes it became the longest-running prime time drama series on Canadian television.

The cast of Cold Squad was diverse and changing. Except for Julie Stewart, almost the entire cast was replaced between the second and third seasons, and the series revamped. The revision was meant to attract a younger audience and more male viewers. (Michael Hogan, who played main character Det. Tony Logozzo in Seasons 1 and 2, appeared in the third season two-part opener episode "Deadly Games" but thereafter was gone from the series).

Starting with the third season, the "Cold Squad" division was folded into a province-wide task force and its basement setting eliminated. Along with significant variations of the title sequence (Seasons 1–2, 3–6, 7), theme music (Seasons 1–2, 3–4, 5–6, 7), new sets (Seasons 3–6, 7), and change in McCormick's hair colour from auburn to blonde along with her wardrobe (in particular her jacket), these differences contributed to a considerable reworking of the series. The only character to appear in all seven seasons was Sgt. Ali McCormick.

Cast and characters

Main cast

 Julie Stewart as Sgt. Ali (Alison) McCormick
 Michael Hogan as Det. Tony Logozzo (seasons 1–2 | Guest season 3)
 Joy Tanner as Jill Stone (seasons 1–2)
 Paul Boretski as Det. Nick Gallagher (season 1)
 Jerry Wasserman as Insp. Vince Schneider (season 1)
 Hiro Kanagawa as Det. James Kai (seasons 1–2)
 Jay Brazeau as Sam Fisher (seasons 1–2, 4 | Recurring season 3)
 Paul Coeur as Sgt. Lloyd Mastrowski  (seasons 1–2)
 Eli Gabay as  Det. Larry Iredell (season 1)
 Linda Ko as Christine Liu (seasons 1–2)
 Bob Frazer as Det. Eddie Carson (season 2)
 Lori Triolo as Det. Jackie Cortez (season 2)
 Peter Wingfield as Insp. Simon Ross (season 2 | Guest season 3)
 Garry Chalk  as Insp. Andrew Pawlachuk (seasons 4–7 | Recurring season 3)
 Tamara Craig Thomas as Det. Mickey Kollander (seasons 3–6)
 Gregory Calpakis as Det. Nicco Sevallis (seasons 3–6)
 Stephen McHattie as Sgt. Frank Coscarella (seasons 3–4)
 Joely Collins as Christine Wren (seasons 4–7)
 Matthew Bennett as Det. Len Harper (seasons 5–7 | Recurring season 4)
 Sonja Bennett as Det. Samantha Walters (season 7)
 Tahmoh Penikett as Cst. Ray Chase (season 7)

Recurring cast

 Tasha Simms as Dep. Chief Malcolm (seasons 1, 2) 
 Stacy Grant as Leanne Walker (seasons 1, 3, 6) 
 Keith Martin Gordey as Judge Foster (seasons 2, 4)
 Timothy Webber  as Desmond Cage (seasons 2, 5)
 Richard Ian Cox as Manny Needlebaum (season 3)
 Sharon Alexander as Bernice Boyle (season 3)
 Allan Lysell as Det. Bill Overmyer (season 3)
 Lisa Houle as Rachel Sherman (seasons 3, 4) 
 David Palffy as Bailey Gallanson (seasons 3, 4)
 Michael David Simms as Sgt. Casey  (seasons 3, 4, 5)
 Jill Teed as Laura  (seasons 4, 5)
 Kate Logie as Vanessa (seasons 4, 5)
 Craig Warkentin as Vito (seasons 4, 5)
 Laurie Murdoch as Chief Perkins (seasons 4, 6)
 Lawrence Ricketts as Hank Johnson (seasons 4, 6)
 Crystal Bublé as Billie (seasons 5, 6)
 Bryan Genesse as Dan (seasons 5, 6)
 Brenda James as Sonia Parker (season 6) 
 Adrian Holmes as Dr. Ben Wilson (seasons 6, 7) 
 Chilton Crane as Wanda Harper (seasons 6, 7)
 Michael Rogers as Chief Wilcox  (seasons 6, 7)
 JR Bourne as Paul Deeds (season 7)

Development and production
Cold Squad was originally conceived in 1995 as a one-hour series for the Lifetime channel in the United States. Baton Broadcasting became involved in its development in November 1995. Lifetime, however, backed out in mid-1996 and in 1997 the producers partnered with Alliance Atlantis.

At the time Cold Squad was developed, the production of television series in Vancouver was heavily dominated by programs made for the United States. When Cold Squad was greenlit it became the first one-hour, prime time dramatic series for Canadian television to be produced out of Vancouver.

After Baton committed to local production of the series, the producers reached an agreement with Canadian labor union ACFC West (Association of Canadian Film Craftspeople) to cut the cost of labor on 13 episodes by $225,000 (CAD). With this concession, the overall budget to produce the first season became approximately $12.5 million (CAD).

An unexpected cash crunch by Telefilm Canada's Equity Investment Program affected the corporation's funding for the series and the original order for 13 episodes was reduced to 11 episodes. Funding was adjusted and both Baton and Alliance Atlantis committed to an increased financial investment in the production of Cold Squad, with the budget per episode at $900,000-plus (CAD). Baton thereafter reoriented its involvement to that of being the series' Canadian broadcaster only. Keatley MacLeod Productions retained 75% copyright ownership and the rights to U.S. distribution, and Alliance Atlantis retained 25% ownership with distribution rights in other international territories. (Baton Broadcasting, which had full control of the CTV network, was reorganized and renamed CTV Inc. in December 1998. In March 2000, CTV Inc. was acquired by Bell Canada Enterprises.)

Originally scheduled to start on June 16, 1997, filming on Cold Squad began on July 2, 1997, and the new series' scheduled premiere was changed from September 1997 to January 1998.

Cold Case intellectual property controversy
When U.S. television network CBS announced the premiere of Cold Case for its 2003/2004 schedule, John Doyle of The Globe and Mail wrote: "Cold Case...is a new drama about a blond, female cop (played by Kathryn Morris) who tracks down old, cold cases and faces discrimination because she's a woman. It has no connection with Cold Squad, a Canadian series about a blond, female cop who tracks down old, cold cases and faces discrimination because she's a woman." The likeness to Cold Squad was also noted by other Canadian television critics. Stephanie Earp of TV Guide wrote: "Last fall, American viewers got excited about a new crime drama that revolves around a tough blond detective with an edgy haircut who solves cold cases. Of course, Canadian viewers got excited by that show back in '98, when it debuted under the name Cold Squad."

The comparison between Cold Squad and Cold Case became compelling when it was revealed that Meredith Stiehm, the creator of Cold Case, had attended seminars on television writing in April 2002 at the Canadian Film Centre and was informed about the concept of Cold Squad during one of the sessions.

The similarities led Cold Squad series creators Matt MacLeod and Julia Keatley to retain intellectual property attorney Carole Handler, of Los Angeles law firm O'Donnell & Schaeffer, to broker talks with Cold Case producer Jerry Bruckheimer and Warner Bros. MacLeod declined to discuss details but said, "We are deeply concerned [about the shows' similarities]...We're taking the appropriate actions." Confirming that written correspondence was proceeding between the producers of the two shows, Handler stated, "We hope to work out the producers' concerns. This is a real issue. My clients are the creators of the original concept." Recourse in the matter included the option of doing nothing, a settlement involving royalties or a format payment, or a lawsuit.

CTV acquired the rights to broadcast Cold Case in Canada and added the series to its Fall 2003 schedule, at the same time postponing the last season of Cold Squad until Fall 2004.  The network took advantage of the resemblance between the two shows by scheduling both during the same prime time day of the week, Sunday, publicizing the programming as a "crime theme night", with Cold Case airing at 8 p.m. and Cold Squad at 10 p.m.

During the 18th Gemini Awards, awards host Seán Cullen bluntly echoed a shared sentiment about CTV bumping Cold Squad off its fall programming in favor of the new American cop show: "Screw you Cold Case. I love Cold Squad."

When Cold Squad went into syndication in the United States the similitude between it and Cold Case raised eyebrows — until American viewers discovered that Cold Squad was the precedent series.

Episodes

Release

Broadcast
The premiere of the final season was delayed until Fall 2004 and its programming changed to 9 p.m. Saturday as part of CTV's "crime time" block.

Due to the network's sporadic scheduling of the season, the last episodes of the series premiered in their French-dubbed versions on Séries+ in 2004, long before the English-language versions of those episodes aired on CTV in the Spring of 2005.

In July 2000, CanWest Global Communications obtained the international distribution rights for Cold Squad from Endemol Entertainment Holding NV when it purchased the company's television library. Endemol had procured the rights from Alliance Atlantis.

Alliance Atlantis owned Showcase and within Canada reruns of Cold Squad aired on the channel (Showcase was acquired by CanWest in 2007 after its purchase of Alliance Atlantis).

Syndication

In 2005, Thunderbird Films acquired the syndication rights to the series. In Europe, Sony Pictures Television International secured the license to broadcast the program from Fireworks International in October 2005. In the United States, Program Partners (PPI Releasing) acquired the syndication rights from Thunderbird in January 2006, and the series began airing in the U.S. in Fall 2006 as part of a "Crime Watch" block package.  In June 2008, the syndication was renewed for an additional season to begin airing in the fall.

Cold Squad was seen in off-network syndication intermittently on cable specialty channel Mystery TV, and also on Bravo. The series aired on digital cable channel Sleuth in the U.S. in 2009. It was then broadcast on digital television networks, such as Tuff TV. It began airing on Retro TV in 2011. Also in 2011, My Family TV added Cold Squad to its roster of programs and continued to carry the series after rebranding as The Family Channel. In May 2019, the series began airing on the El Rey Network.

Home media
Alliance Atlantis released the DVD of Season 1 for Region 1 in Canada only, on September 2, 2003. It became available in the United States in 2009. The Region 2 DVD of Season 1 was released in the Netherlands (English audio with Dutch subtitles) by Just Entertainment Bv on March 20, 2012. It became available in the United Kingdom as an import.

The Season 2 DVD (Region 2) was released in the Netherlands (English audio with Dutch subtitles) by Just Entertainment Bv on June 19, 2012. It was made available in the United Kingdom as an import.

Digital distribution of Cold Squad became available in the U.S. as instant streaming on Netflix in 2011. The complete series (98 episodes) was made available as video on demand (VOD) on Hulu in February 2013. Amazon Video added Season 1 to its North American library in October 2015, Season 2 in September 2016, Season 3 in October 2016, and Season 4 in March 2017. In the United Kingdom, Amazon Instant Video UK added Season 2 first to its library in September 2016, Seasons 1 and 3 in October 2016, and Season 4 in February 2017. The series became available on Tubi in 2018.

Reception
In a final season interview with Julie Stewart, media and television columnist Bill Brioux wrote: "Cold Squad has consistently been one of the top-rated Canadian-produced TV shows, despite being booted all over CTV's schedule."

Awards and nominations
Cold Squad was nominated for 38 Gemini Awards, 49 Leo Awards, one Directors Guild of Canada award, and two Writers Guild of Canada awards during its seven-season run. The series won seven Gemini Awards, including Julie Stewart for "Best Performance by an Actress in a Continuing Leading Dramatic Role" (2002), Garry Chalk for "Best Performance by an Actor in a Featured Supporting Role in a Dramatic Series" (2002 and 2001), and Tamara Craig Thomas for "Best Performance by an Actress in a Featured Supporting Role in a Dramatic Series" (2001). It won four Leo Awards, including Julie Stewart for "Best Lead Performance By A Female in a Dramatic Series" (2003).

Directors Guild of Canada

Gemini Awards

Leo Awards

Writers Guild of Canada

See also
 List of female detective characters
 List of police television dramas

Television series

Notes

References

Further reading
  (Published originally in the Toronto Sun on September 25, 1998.)
 
 

Books
 Brooks, Tim and Marsh, Earle F. (2007).  The Complete Directory to Prime Time Network and Cable TV Shows, 1946-Present. Ballantine Books. 9th ed., pp 270–271, .
 
 Terrace, Vincent (2011)  Encyclopedia of Television Shows, 1925 through 2010. McFarland & Company, 2d ed., p 199, .

External links 
  (Archive)
  
 
 
 
  Cold Squad cast and producers at Getty Images
  Cold Squad at Thunderbird Entertainment
  Cold Squad at PPI Releasing
  Cold Squad sets by Andrew Deskin, Production Design
  Cold Squad sets by Marian Wihak, Production Design
  Cold Squad Season 1 DVD cover (Netherlands)
  Cold Squad Season 2 DVD cover  (Netherlands)
 
 
 

1998 Canadian television series debuts
2005 Canadian television series endings
1990s Canadian crime drama television series
2000s Canadian crime drama television series
Canadian mystery television series
Detective television series
Canadian police procedural television series
Police procedurals
Television shows set in Vancouver
Television shows filmed in Vancouver
Television series by Alliance Atlantis
Television series by Bell Media
CTV Television Network original programming
Canadian Screen Award-winning television shows